Arthur Newman Dare (May 25, 1850 – September 4, 1923) was a Minnesota Republican politician and Speaker of the Minnesota House of Representatives. The publisher of the Star News in Elk River, Minnesota, Dare was first elected to the Minnesota House of Representatives in 1894. Dare served three terms, becoming speaker in 1899.

Biography
Arthur N. Dare was born in Jordan, New York on Mary 25, 1850.

He died in Elk River on September 4, 1923.

References

1850 births
1923 deaths
People from Onondaga County, New York
Speakers of the Minnesota House of Representatives
Republican Party members of the Minnesota House of Representatives